Hurricane's Gal is a 1922 American silent adventure film produced, written and directed by Allen Holubar and starring his wife Dorothy Phillips. It was distributed through Associated First National Pictures.

Cast
Dorothy Phillips as Lola
Robert Ellis as Steele O'Connor
Wallace Beery as Chris Borg
James O. Barrows as Cap'n Danny
Gertrude Astor as Phyllis Fairfield
Willie Fung as Sing
Jack Donovan as Lieutenant Grant
Frances Raymond as Mrs. Fairfield

Preservation status
The film survives in Archives Du Film Du CNC (Bois d'Arcy) and Gosfilmofond, Moscow State.

See also
Gertrude Astor filmography

References

External links

1922 films
American silent feature films
Films directed by Allen Holubar
First National Pictures films
American black-and-white films
American adventure films
1922 adventure films
1920s American films
Silent adventure films
1920s English-language films